George Gray may refer to:

Politics 
 George Gray (Pennsylvania politician) (1725–1800), speaker of the Pennsylvania Provincial Assembly
 George Gray (Delaware politician) (1840–1925), U.S. Senator from Delaware
 George Wilkie Gray (1844–1924), businessman and member of the Queensland Legislative Council
 George Gray (Tasmanian politician) (1899–1984), member of both houses of the Tasmanian Parliament
 George Gray (Queensland politician, born 1903) (1903–1967), member of the Australian House of Representatives

Science 
 George Robert Gray (1808–1872), British zoologist
 George Gray (chemist) (1926–2013), British chemist, developer of cyano-biphenyl liquid crystals used in liquid crystal displays

Sports 
 George Gray (shot putter) (1865–1933), Canadian shot putter
 George Gray (hurdler) (1887–1970), British Olympic hurdler
 George Gray (footballer, born 1894) (1894–1972), English football wing half active in the 1920s, later trainer of Sunderland
 George Gray (footballer, born 1925) (1925–1995), English football wing half active in the 1950s, son of the above
 One Man Gang (George Gray, born 1960), American professional wrestler

Others 
 Sir George Gray, 3rd Baronet (c. 1710–1773), British Army officer
 George Gray, founder of the Hawkhurst Gang, a notorious smuggling organisation in southeast England from 1735 until 1749
 George Seaman Gray (1835–1885), American minister and author
 George Zabriskie Gray (1837–1889), American clergyman, educator and theologian of the Episcopal Church
 George Kruger Gray (1880–1943), English artist and coin designer
 George Charles Gray (1897–1981), English cathedral organist
 George Gray (television personality) (born 1967), American television presenter

See also
 George Grey (disambiguation)